Pastperfect is a live DVD by VNV Nation that was released on 4 May 2004 containing; a 12 track live DVD, and a DVD and CD of interviews, behind the scenes, a making of, and videos of live footage.

It charted at no. 96 in the mainstream German chart, for one week.

Track listing

References

External links
 VNV Nation Website
 VNV Nation MySpace Page
 

VNV Nation albums
Live video albums
2004 live albums
2004 compilation albums
2004 video albums